Gregg Renfrew is an American entrepreneur and businessperson. She established The Wedding List in the United States, which was later acquired by Martha Stewart in 2001, making it the first acquisition under the Martha Stewart Living brand. In March 2013, Renfrew launched Beautycounter, a beauty brand focused on creating safer skincare and cleaner cosmetics products.

Career
Renfrew started a house cleaning company with two friends on Nantucket over a summer in college. Renfrew co-founded the bridesmaid company Elizabeth Gregg and was later introduced to Nicole Hindmarch, the founder of The Wedding List, a London-based bridal registry company. Renfrew partnered with Hindmarch and launched The Wedding List in the United States in 1997. She created a website to make the personalized shopping service an online experience. Nordstrom invested $1 million in the company. Martha Stewart partnered with the company to include the commerce angle to her weddings magazine and ended up acquiring the company in 2001. Renfrew continued running The Wedding List as part of the Martha Stewart Living brand.

In 2001, Renfrew began a retail consulting practice and worked with companies such as J.Crew, Bergdorf Goodman and Intermix. In 2006, she became CEO of children's retail organization Best & Co. Renfrew left Best & Co. in March 2008 and moved to Los Angeles. She resumed retail consulting and worked with Jessica Alba.

Renfrew launched Beautycounter, a beauty brand that works to create safer products, in March 2013. Renfrew worked with Beautycounter to establish a list of 1,800 potentially harmful ingredients that the company avoids using in its products, known as the "Never List."

In 2014, Renfrew was named one of Fast Company'''s Most Creative People and in 2019 became a member of the publication's Impact Council.

In 2018, Renfrew was named on Inc.'' Magazine's Female Founders 100 list and was also included on Goldman Sach's Most Intriguing Entrepreneurs list.

Renfrew has been known to actively lobby for regulation in the cosmetics industry to limit the number of harmful chemicals included in products sold in America. In December 2019, she testified as an expert witness in a Congressional hearing on cosmetic reform.

In January 2021, it was announced that Renfrew was an early investor in Thirteen Lune, an e-commerce site focused on makeup, skincare, haircare and wellness products owned by people of color and ally brands.

References

Year of birth missing (living people)
Living people
American women chief executives
American retail chief executives
Miss Porter's School alumni
American lobbyists
Date of birth missing (living people)
20th-century American businesswomen
21st-century American businesswomen
20th-century American businesspeople
21st-century American businesspeople